Phyllalia ziczac is a moth in the family Eupterotidae. It was described by Strand in 1911. It is found in South Africa. Only one specimen has been recorded.

References

Endemic moths of South Africa
Moths described in 1911
Eupterotinae